Pultenaea polifolia, commonly known as dusky bush-pea, is a species of flowering plant in the family Fabaceae and is endemic to south-eastern continental Australia. It is an erect to prostrate shrub with linear or elliptic to egg-shaped leaves with the narrower end towards the base, and yellow to orange and red to purple flowers.

Description
The edge of the leaves curves downwards, the upper surface is glabrous and the lower surface is paler and hairy.

Taxonomy
Pultenaea polifolia was first formally described in 1825 by Allan Cunningham in Barron Field's Geographical Memoirs on New South Wales. The meaning of the specific epithet is unclear, but may mean Polium-leaved, "Polium" being now known as Teucrium montanum.

Distribution and habitat
Dusky bush-pea grows in heath and is found in New South Wales south from the New England National Park through the coast and tablelands to the Australian Capital Territory and north-eastern Victoria.

References

Fabales of Australia
Flora of New South Wales
Flora of Victoria (Australia)
Flora of the Australian Capital Territory
polifolia
Plants described in 1825
Taxa named by Allan Cunningham (botanist)